Yana Urqu (Quechua yana black, urqu mountain, "black mountain", also spelled Yana Orco) is mountain in the Cordillera Central in the Andes of Peru which reaches a height of approximately  . It is located in the Lima Region, Yauyos Province,  Laraos District. Yana Urqu lies northwest of Uchku and a lake named Pumaqucha.

References 

Mountains of Lima Region
Mountains of Peru